Cyphoidris is a genus of ants in the subfamily Myrmicinae. The genus is known from Africa.

Species
Cyphoidris exalta Bolton, 1981 – Central Africa
Cyphoidris parissa Bolton, 1981 – West Africa
Cyphoidris spinosa Weber, 1952 – Central Africa
Cyphoidris werneri Bolton, 1981 – East Africa

References

External links

Myrmicinae
Ant genera
Hymenoptera of Africa